Deh Nesa-ye Sofla (also Romanized as Deh Nesā-ye Soflá; also known as Deh Nesā-e Pā‘īn) is a village in Vardasht Rural District, in the Central District of Semirom County, Isfahan Province, Iran. At the 2006 census, its population was 123, in 29 families.

References 

Populated places in Semirom County